Haydariyeh  is a Syrian village located in Shathah Subdistrict in Al-Suqaylabiyah District, Hama.  According to the Syria Central Bureau of Statistics (CBS), Haydariyeh had a population of 2554 in the 2004 census.

References 

Populated places in al-Suqaylabiyah District